Blaberolaelaps is a genus of mites in the family Laelapidae.

Species
 Blaberolaelaps beckeri Hunter, Rosario & Flechtmann, 1988     
 Blaberolaelaps matthiesensis M. Costa, 1980

References

Laelapidae